Bourrelly is a surname. Notable people with the surname include:

 Henri Marius Bourrelly (1905–1991), known by his stage name of Rellys, French actor
 Marius Bourrelly (1820–1896), French poet and playwright who wrote in Provençal
 , French phycologist